Beta Radio's self-released sophomore album, Colony of Bees was recorded largely in the home studios of band members Benjamin Mabry and Brent Holloman and marks a subtle departure in style from their debut Seven Sisters. The record features a fuller sound than its predecessor thanks in part to the lengthier recording period and accomplished personnel appearing on the record. Of note is respected composer/arranger/violinist Rob Moose (Sufjan Stevens, Bon Iver, Ben Folds, Arcade Fire).

Track listing
 Take My Photograph – 3:31
 East of Tennessee – 3:35
 I Am Mine – 4:04
 Come on Make it Right Once – 3:04
 First Began – 4:44
 Vera – 1:18
 Sitting Room – 4:09
 On the Frame – 3:39
 Kilimanjaro – 4:35
 White Fawn – 3:06
 Here Too Far – 0:55
 Monument – 5:18

References

2014 albums
Beta Radio albums